Biała  is a district of  Rzeszów, Subcarpathian Voivodeship, in south-eastern Poland. It merged with Rzeszów on 1 January 2009.

The former village had a population of 1,300.

History 

As a result of the first of Partitions of Poland (Treaty of St-Petersburg dated 5 July 1772, the Galicia area was attributed to the Habsburg Monarchy. BIALA was one of the 79   Bezirkshauptmannschaft (powiat?)  in Austrian Galicia.

For more details, see the article Kingdom of Galicia and Lodomeria.

References

Rzeszów